is a railway station on the Hokuriku Main Line in Kaga, Ishikawa, Japan, operated by West Japan Railway Company (JR West).

Lines

Station layout
The station consists of two opposed side platforms connected by a  level crossing. The station is unattended.

Platforms

History
The station opened on 20 September 1897. With the privatization of JNR on 1 April 1987, the station came under the control of JR West.

Surrounding area
Iburibashi Post Office
Katayamazu onsen

See also
 List of railway stations in Japan

External links

  

Stations of West Japan Railway Company
Railway stations in Ishikawa Prefecture
Railway stations in Japan opened in 1897
Hokuriku Main Line
Kaga, Ishikawa